Littleton is both a surname and a masculine given name. Notable people with the name include:

Surname:
Littleton baronets, numerous English jurists and politicians
Ananias Charles Littleton (1886–1974), American accounting scholar
Benjamin Horsley Littleton (1889–1966), American judge
C. Scott Littleton (1933–2010), American anthropologist and academic
Carol Littleton (born 1942), American film editor
Col. Littleton (born 1943), American fashion designer
Edward Littleton, 1st Baron Hatherton (1791–1863), British politician
Edward Littleton, 2nd Baron Hatherton (1815–1888), British politician
Edward Littleton (colonial administrator) (died 1705), English businessman
Harvey Littleton (1922–2013), American educator and glass artist
Herbert A. Littleton (1930–1951), United States Marine
Humphrey Littleton (died 1606), English Gunpowder Plotter
Jody Littleton (born 1974), American football player
Larry Littleton (born 1954), American baseball player
Martin W. Littleton (1872–1934), American politician
Michael Flannan Littleton (1938–2002), Irish chess master
Peggy Littleton, American politician
Timothy Littleton (died 1679), English judge
Wes Littleton (born 1982), American baseball player

Fictional characters:
Claire Littleton, character in the television series Lost

Given name:
Littleton Dennis Jr. (1765–1833), associate justice of the Maryland Court of Appeals
Littleton Purnell Dennis (1786–1834), American politician
Littleton Fowler, American baseball player
Littleton Groom (1867–1936), Australian politician
Littleton Kirkpatrick (1797–1859), American politician
Littleton W. Moore (1835–1911), American politician
Littleton Powys (died 1732), English judge
Littleton Waller (1856–1926), United States Marine Corps general
Littleton Waller Tazewell (1774–1860), American politician
Littleton Waller Tazewell Bradford (1848–1918), American politician

Masculine given names